James Jackson Bullock (born February 9, 1955) is an American actor and comedian of stage, television, and motion pictures. He starred in the sitcom Too Close for Comfort.

Early life
Bullock was born in Casper, Wyoming, and raised in Odessa, Texas (although  he is listed as an alumnus of Natrona County High School (Casper, Wyoming)), and was raised in a Southern Baptist home and as a youth, planned to become an evangelical Christian minister. He received a music scholarship to attend Oklahoma Baptist University in Shawnee, Oklahoma, but left school without graduating.

Career
Credited as "JM J. Bullock" because there was another "Jim Bullock" in the actors union, Bullock became a notable entertainment figure in the 1980s when he co-starred on the sitcom Too Close for Comfort as Monroe Ficus and was a regular guest on John Davidson's updated version of the game show Hollywood Squares; Bullock occasionally substituted for Davidson as host. He also appeared as a semi-regular on Battlestars and occasionally on Match Game-Hollywood Squares Hour.

He later became a semi-regular on ALF (from 1989 to 1990) as Neal Tanner. Bullock was the guest host of a special episode of Super Sloppy Double Dare in 1989 in which host Marc Summers and announcer Harvey played against each other. The game ended with both Summers and Harvey playing the obstacle course and winning all eight prizes for their respective teammates. Stage assistants Robin Marrella and Dave Shikiar were the guest announcers for that episode.

After ALF went off the air in 1990, Bullock remained active with theatre, television, and film work. He briefly hosted a syndicated talk show with ex-televangelist Tammy Faye Messner. The Jim J. and Tammy Faye Show debuted in 1996, but Messner exited the program a few months later following a cancer diagnosis. Bullock continued with new co-host, Ann Abernathy, and the show became The Jim J. and Ann Show until it was canceled.

Bullock was the voice of Queer Duck in the animated series of cartoons of the same name which have appeared on both the internet and the cable TV network Showtime. In 2000, Bullock was a regular panelist on the revival of I've Got a Secret. He also performed on the national tour of the Broadway production Hairspray as Wilbur Turnblad, a role he took to the Broadway stage starting September 18, 2007. Some of his other noteworthy roles include the pilled-up narcoleptic Prince Valium in the 1987 Mel Brooks movie Spaceballs, and the "not-quite-out-of-the-closet" character in a dating montage at the beginning of 2001's Kissing Jessica Stein. From 2004 to 2007, he had a recurring role as Mr. Monroe, a teacher at the fictional James K. Polk Middle School on the Nickelodeon live-action sitcom Ned's Declassified School Survival Guide.

Personal life
In 1985, while Too Close For Comfort was being retooled as The Ted Knight Show, Bullock learned that he was HIV positive. He made his diagnosis public 11 years later.

In 1996, Bullock's partner of six years, John Casey, died from AIDS-related complications.  Bullock is a longtime survivor of the virus and, was still healthy due in part to antiretroviral drugs.

On February 17, 1999, Bullock was arrested outside a bar in West Hollywood, California, for possession of crystal meth, and was sentenced to probation.

Filmography

References

External links
 
 
 
 Jim J. Bullock at Internet Off-Broadway Database

1955 births
Male actors from Wyoming
Male actors from Texas
American male comedians
21st-century American comedians
American male film actors
American male stage actors
American male television actors
American television talk show hosts
American male voice actors
American gay actors
LGBT Baptists
Gay comedians
LGBT people from Texas
LGBT people from Wyoming
Living people
Lee Strasberg Theatre and Film Institute alumni
Oklahoma Baptist University alumni
People from Casper, Wyoming
People from Odessa, Texas
People with HIV/AIDS
Southern Baptists
Permian High School alumni
American LGBT comedians